The 2008–09 Fulham season was the club's 111th professional season and their eighth consecutive season in the top flight of English football, the Premier League, since their return in 2001. They were managed by Roy Hodgson in his first full season as Fulham manager. They played in the Premier League by virtue of staying up on goal difference from Reading on the last day of the previous campaign and were hoping to improve on their placing of 17th. They eventually finished in seventh place in the Premier League table with 53 points, an improvement of ten places and 18 points. Their league position secured a place in the newly formed UEFA Europa League for the 2009–10 season as well as their highest League finish in their history. The club received a number of additional awards from the Premier League, namely the Fair Play Award, the Behaviour of the Public Award and the Barclays Spirit Award for manager Roy Hodgson.

Some of the most notable results of the season came against clubs who finished in the top four in the table. The club beat Manchester United and Arsenal at home and managed a draw at home against Chelsea. In other competitions, Fulham reached the quarter-finals of the FA Cup before losing to league champions Manchester United. In the Football League Cup, they defeated Leicester City in the second round but were knocked out by Burnley in the third round.

Pre-season
Roy Hodgson added to the team in the summer with signings including goalkeeper Mark Schwarzer from Middlesbrough and strikers Bobby Zamora from West Ham United and Andy Johnson who arrived from Everton for a club record £10.5 million (though Steve Marlet had cost more when including agents fees in 2001). Club captain Brian McBride decided to return to United States, where he eventually signed with Major League Soccer's Chicago Fire. Olivier Dacourt joined Fulham during the winter transfer window.

Fulham also put out teams in away matches consisting of first and reserve team players against Walton Casuals (won 3–1), Staines Town (lost 2–0), Banstead (won 3–0)Goals coming in from Jordan Wilson, Joe Anderson and Enrico dos Santos continued the win streak for the whites, Carshalton (won 2–0), Crystal Palace (drew 0–0) and Kingstonian (won 8–0).

Premier League
Fulham started the season playing away at the KC Stadium against newly promoted Hull City. Seol Ki-hyeon gave Fulham the lead in the eighth minute. Their lead lasted less than 15 minutes because Geovanni equalised in the 22nd minute. Caleb Folan completed the Hull turn-around ten minutes from the end of normal time, capping a 2–1 victory for the home team. However, the following week the team gained their first victory of the season with a win against much-fancied Arsenal for only the second time in 43 years. The only goal of the game came from Brede Hangeland midway through the first half who scored directly from a Jimmy Bullard cross, from a couple of yards. A slightly off-colour Arsenal played their usual passing game but could not break Fulham down.

The team did not have another Premier League game to play until 13 September due to Manchester United's participation in the UEFA Super Cup, as well as the break from league football at the beginning of September for international World Cup qualifying matches.

On 17 May 2009, the club confirmed their highest ever league finish with a 1–0 victory over relegation-threatened Newcastle United at St James' Park. The victory kept them in seventh place in the table, with eighth being the lowest they could finish, bettering the ninth-place finish in 2004. Kamara scored in the 41st minute of a tense game which was full of chances for both sides.

 Fulham's home match against Blackburn Rovers was postponed due to a waterlogged pitch on 10 January 2009. Their match away against Manchester United, due to be played in August, was rearranged due to United's involvement in the UEFA Super Cup.

Premier League table

Results summary

Results by round

FA Cup
The club entered the FA Cup in the third round, with an away match against Sheffield Wednesday at Hillsborough on 3 January 2009. Fulham took the lead through Andrew Johnson from a Danny Murphy through-ball in the 12th minute but were pegged back by a 25-yard goal from Tommy Spurr after 21 minutes. The game remained 1–1 until the 88th minute, when Andy Johnson scored his second of the game which turned out to be the winner.

Fulham next faced one of only two non-league sides left in the competition, Kettering Town. After a positive opening from the underdogs Kettering, Fulham took the lead in the 12th minute, Simon Davies scoring a volley from 15 yards from a Clint Dempsey cross. But the lead only lasted until the 36th minute as the lively Craig Westcarr scored a deflected freekick. Kettering continued to press after the break and with the additions of Danny Murphy and Bobby Zamora, they regained the lead in the 77th minute with Murphy scoring the goal. Kettering, however, were not finished and 9 minutes later, Westcarr scored a penalty after a trip from Brede Hangeland. With Kettering planning a trip to London, Andy Johnson and Zamora scored two late goals to seal the tie.

In the fifth round, Fulham were drawn away again to Championship side Swansea City at the Liberty Stadium. Roy Hodgson made three changes from Fulham's last Premier League match against Wigan, with Dempsey and Paintsil rested after playing abroad in midweek for their countries. to be replaced by Gera and Stoor while Zamora also dropped to the bench in favour of Nevland. Swansea created some clear-cut opportunities in the early stages, with Mark Gower, Alan Tate and Lloyd Dyer testing Mark Schwarzer. Fulham, however, found the breakthrough a minute before half-time with a slice of luck as Paul Konchesky's corner was deflected in off Swansea defender Garry Monk. Swansea continued to dominate and equalised in the 52nd minute when Jason Scotland scored, evading a challenge before firing the ball low past Schwarzer. With both sides playing attractive passing football the sides could not be separated.

Fulham and Swansea both went into the hat for the quarter-finals and were given the prospect of a tie with defending Premier League and Champions League champions Manchester United. They first had to get through the fifth round replay, which took place on 24 February 2009 at Craven Cottage. It was Fulham's second game in three days but Roy Hodgson put out a strong side with the only changes being Nevland replacing Johnson up front and Dacourt making his first start for the club in place of Danny Murphy. Jason Scotland scored just after half-time following an even first half, knocking the ball in from 15 yards. Fulham, however, did not give up, Zamora coming close on several occasions before they equalised through Dempsey in the 67th minute. Four minutes later, they turned the game around when Zamora scored his second goal in as many games. The home side held on to secure victory.

Football League Cup
Fulham entered the Football League Cup at the second round stage after receiving the bye awarded to Premier League clubs in the first round. They faced a Leicester City side finding their feet in League One after relegation the previous season. Fulham took the lead in the 31st minute through one of their new signings, Hungarian international Zoltán Gera, but Leicester turned the game around in the early stages of the second half. Veteran Paul Dickov drew them level on 46 minutes and just two minutes later Andy King completed the turnaround. The match remained 2–1 until the 83rd minute when Jimmy Bullard levelled the score. But this was not the end of the scoring and with the game seemingly heading for extra-time, Danny Murphy scored the winner for Fulham in the second minute of stoppage time to win the encounter and send Fulham through to the third round.

In the third round, a Fulham side featuring the attacking talents of Johnson, Gera and Dempsey lost 1–0 to a Burnley side who had been performing well and sitting in the play-off positions in the Championship. With the match seemingly heading for extra-time, Jay Rodriguez won the match in the 88th minute. He collected a Chris Eagles through ball just inside the area and then slotted the ball past Pascal Zuberbühler. Fulham were therefore knocked out of the competition.

Statistics

Squad statistics
Elliot Omozusi received Jimmy Bullard's squad number 21, when Bullard left the club. Giles Barnes wore number 7 while Seol Ki-hyeon was out on loan.

Statistics correct as of final match against Everton, played 24 May 2009.

 * Player out on loan
 ** Player left club

Top scorers

Transfers

Summer
Mark Schwarzer arrived on a free transfer from Middlesbrough when his contract expired and fellow goalkeeper David Stockdale came from Darlington. Despite the promotion of West Bromwich Albion to the Premier League, Zoltán Gera rejected "the best contract the club could [offer]" and signed with Fulham. The club also signed Andranik Teymourian from Bolton Wanderers on 12 June 2008. Toni Kallio signed a permanent contract after a loan spell during the second half of the previous season. On 15 July 2008, Bobby Zamora and John Pantsil signed on a joint-deal from West Ham United. On 30 July 2008, Sweden international Fredrik Stoor signed a deal with the team, moving on from Rosenborg. Andy Johnson was bought from Everton for a fee of around £10.5 million, Fulham's second highest transfer fee.

Fulham released ten players, including Carlos Bocanegra, Philippe Christanval and goalkeeper Tony Warner. Paul Stalteri returned to Tottenham Hotspur after a loan spell and Brian McBride returned to the United States to play for the Chicago Fire. Norwich City took two of Fulham's players, Dejan Stefanović permanently and Elliot Omozusi on loan for the season. Two goalkeepers also left the club, as Ricardo Batista left for Sporting CP and veteran Kasey Keller was released. David Healy moved to Sunderland, Steven Davis made a permanent switch to Rangers and Moritz Volz and Hameur Bouazza both went out on loan. Alexey Smertin had his contract with Fulham terminated.

In

 Kallio had been on loan at the club since January on loan and signed a permanent two-year deal.
 Zamora and Paintsil came for a joint fee of £6,300,000.

Out

Winter
The first departures of the winter transfer window happened in December when Lee Cook returned to his former club Queens Park Rangers on a permanent deal, having spent several months back there on loan. He had not made any first-team appearances for Fulham since signing in the summer 2007 transfer window. Gabriel Zakuani also moved to Peterborough United following a successful loan spell. Midfielder Jimmy Bullard also left the club on 23 January 2009, signing for Hull City in a £5 million deal. He had been a target for Bolton Wanderers but they decided not to pursue their interest in him. Adrian Leijer and Andranik Teymourian moved on loan to Norwich City and Barnsley respectively, with Elliot Omozusi returning from Norwich. Leon Andreasen signed for German side Hannover 96 on loan. TJ Moncur left the club to sign for League Two side Wycombe Wanderers.

Giles Barnes was Fulham's first signing during the winter transfer window, moving on loan from Derby County until the end of the season. He was also joined on transfer deadline day by former Leeds United player Olivier Dacourt, who also signed on loan from Inter Milan. Julian Gray made his loan signing from Coventry City a permanent deal.

In

Out

Loan out

 David Stockdale was initially signed by Leicester City on a one-month loan deal but this was later extended for the rest of the season.

Club

Coaching staff

Kits
Supplier: Nike
Sponsor: LG

Other information

References

External links
 Fulham F.C. official website

Fulham F.C. seasons
Fulham